Seyed Ali Hosseini (born 2 March 1988) is an Iranian footballer who plays for Esteghlal Ahvaz in the Persian Gulf Pro League.

Club career
Hosseini started his career with Saipa. In summer 2010 he joined Damash. In July 2012 he joined Rah Ahan.

Club career statistics

References
Ali Hosseini at Persianleague.com

1988 births
Living people
Saipa F.C. players
Damash Gilan players
Rah Ahan players
Iranian footballers
Place of birth missing (living people)
Association football fullbacks